Olavtoppen, occasionally anglicised as Olav Peak, is the highest point of Bouvet Island, a volcanic island and dependency of Norway, and the remotest island on Earth. It was first ascended on 21 February 2012 by Aaron Halstead, Will Allen, Bruno Rodi, Johan Llwyd, and Jason Rodi

References

Mountains of Bouvet Island